Tell Me on a Sunday was the first solo album released by Marti Webb.

All tracks were written by Andrew Lloyd Webber and Don Black and told the story of an English girl who has emigrated to the United States and embarks on a succession of romances. The music later formed the first half of a stage show called Song and Dance, in which Webb also starred.

Background

As well as composing the piece, Lloyd Webber also arranged and produced the album. Released in 1980, having been recorded in the latter part of 1979, it was one of his first pieces of work to be published by his own Really Useful Company, which he had formed three years earlier.

The musicians were mainly those that had been involved with the Variations album. American musical theatre actress Elaine Stritch performed a cameo role as an answering service attendee on the track "Capped Teeth and Caesar Salad".

The first single to be released, "Take That Look Off Your Face" reached No.3 in the UK chart in February 1980, while the title track was a minor hit some months later. The album itself was one of the biggest selling albums of the year, when it reached No.2, spending 23 weeks on the chart - eight of them in the top 10. The album was re-issued on compact disc in 1993.

The songs on the album were re-recorded live in 1982 and released as the double album cast recording of Song and Dance with some additional material.

Track listing

Side One 
 "Take That Look Off Your Face"
 "Let Me Finish"
 "It's Not the End of the World (If I Lose Him)"
 "Letter Home to England"
 "Sheldon Bloom"
 "Capped Teeth and Caesar Salad"
 "You Made Me Think You Were In Love"
 "It's Not the End of the World (If He's Younger)"
 "Second Letter Home"

Side Two 
 "Come Back With the Same Look In Your Eyes"
 "Let's Talk About You"
 "Take That Look Off Your Face (Reprise)"
 "Tell Me on a Sunday"
 "It's Not the End of the World (If He's Married)"
 "I'm Very You, You're Very Me"
 "Nothing Like You've Ever Known"
 "Let Me Finish (Reprise)"

Personnel

Musicians 
Marti Webb - lead and backing vocals 
Rod Argent - keyboards
Jon Hiseman - drums
Ricky Hitchcock, Paul Keogh - guitar
Paul Jones - harmonica
Julian Lloyd Webber - cello
John Mole - bass
Morris Pert - percussion
Barbara Thompson - flute, saxophone

Lloyd Webber re-assembled many of the musicians who had contributed to his earlier Variations album, for which he arranged Paganini's caprice for his brother Julian Lloyd Webber's cello, including jazz multi-instrumentalist Barbara Thompson and her husband, drummer Jon Hiseman. Gary Moore engineered the 1987 digital transfer for the album's first release on compact disc.

The London Philharmonic Orchestra, conducted by Harry Rabinowitz, which had earlier played on Lloyd Webber's concept album of Evita, also performed on the tracks "Tell Me on a Sunday" and "It's Not the End of the World (If He's Married)".

Production 
Conductors - David Caddick and Paul Maguire
Engineers - David Hamilton Smith, Martyn Webster, Nigel Green and Dave Harris

Charts

Weekly charts

Year-end charts

References

1980 debut albums
Polydor Records albums
Albums produced by Andrew Lloyd Webber
Marti Webb albums